PJS, PJs or PJ's may refer to:

 Pajamas, a form of clothing
 PJS v News Group Newspapers Ltd
 Peutz–Jeghers syndrome, a genetic disease
 Air Force Pararescue (the para jumpers) of the US Air Force
 P.J.'s, later the Starwood, a nightclub in West Hollywood, California, US
 The PJs, a clay animated television series
 The PJs (soundtrack), a soundtrack album from the TV series
 PJ Trailers, a US company

Schools
 Pusan Japanese School, now Busan Japanese School
 Portland Japanese School

See also
PJ (disambiguation)